Leander Glacier is a tributary glacier in the Admiralty Mountains of Antarctica, draining the area west of Mount Black Prince and flowing south between Shadow Bluff and the McGregor Range to enter Tucker Glacier. It was partially surveyed by the New Zealand Geological Survey Antarctic Expedition (NZGSAE), 1957–58, which also observed the upper parts of the glacier from Mount Midnight and Mount Shadow. It was named by the NZGSAE for the light cruiser HMNZS Leander which served in World War II.

See also
 Pemmican Step

References

Glaciers of Borchgrevink Coast